The Chasse River is a tributary of lac Saint-Jean, flowing the municipality of Sainte-Hedwidge and Saint-Prime, in the Le Domaine-du-Roy Regional County Municipality in the administrative region of Saguenay–Lac-Saint-Jean, in the province of Quebec, in Canada.

The upper part of the Chasse river valley is served by the 5th range road; the intermediate part, by the 4th row road and the 3rd row road; the lower part via Principale Street.

Forestry is the main economic activity in the upper half of this valley; agriculture, in the lower part.

The surface of the Chasse River is usually frozen from the beginning of December to the end of March, except the rapids; however, traffic on the ice is generally safe from mid-December to mid-March.

Geography 
The Chasse River originates at the confluence of several forest streams in Sainte-Hedwidge. This source is located at:
  west of the course of the Ouiatchouaniche River;
  north-west of the village center of Sainte-Hedwidge;
  south-west of the mouth of the "rivière à la Chasse".

  towards the north first in the forest zone, then agricultural, to a bend in the river;
  towards the northeast in the agricultural zone by crossing the route 169 (rue Principale), collecting the stream at Tanis (coming from the southeast ), and cutting the railroad at the end of the segment, until its mouth.

The Chasse river flows on the southwest bank of lac Saint-Jean. This confluence is located between the villages of Saint-Prime and Pointe-Bleue, either:

  west of the center of the village of Pointe-Bleue;
  east of the village center of Saint-Prime;
  northwest of downtown Roberval.

Toponymy 
The toponym "rivière à la Chasse" was formalized on December 5, 1968, at the Place Names Bank of the Commission de toponymie du Québec.

See also 

 Le Domaine-du-Roy Regional County Municipality, a regional county municipality
 Sainte-Hedwidge, a municipality
 Saint-Prime, a municipality
 Lac Saint-Jean, a body of water
 Saguenay River, a stream

Notes and references 

Rivers of Saguenay–Lac-Saint-Jean
Le Domaine-du-Roy Regional County Municipality